Chiarumanipyge is a genus of trilobites in the order Phacopida that existed during the lower Devonian in what is now Bolivia. It was described by Branisa and Vanek in 1973, and the type species is Chiarumanipyge profligata. It was described from the Belén Formation.

References

External links
 Chiarumanipyge at the Paleobiology Database

Devonian trilobites of South America
Calmoniidae
Phacopida genera
Fossil taxa described in 1973